Hets or HETS may refer to:
 Het peoples
 Heavy Equipment Transport System, a military logistics vehicle
 Helicopter External Transport System 
 Torment (1944 film)

See also 
 Het (disambiguation)